The 1996 Swedish Golf Tour was the eleventh season of the Swedish Golf Tour, a series of professional golf tournaments for women held in Sweden.

Maria Hjorth, in her rookie year as a professional, won three tournaments and the Order of Merit.

Schedule
The season consisted of 10 tournaments played between May and September, where two events were included on the 1996 Ladies European Tour.

Order of Merit

Source:

See also
1996 Swedish Golf Tour (men's tour)

References

External links
Official homepage of the Swedish Golf Tour

Swedish Golf Tour (women)
Swedish Golf Tour (women)